Bublik (sometimes spelled as Bublick) is a Ukrainian-language surname, common in Ukraine, Belarus and Southern Russia (Kuban), historically an ethnic Ukrainian region. The name comes from the bagel-like food called bublik, which is common in Eastern Europe.

It may refer to:
 Alexander Bublik (born 1997), tennis player
 Gedaliah Bublick (1875–1948), Yiddish writer
 Ladislav Bublík (1924–1988), Czech writer
 Solomon Bublick (died 1945), American philanthropist

See also
 

Ukrainian-language surnames